The following is a list of all reported tropical cyclones within the Australian region between 90°E and 160°E in the 1950s.

1950–51 
December 10–11, 1950 – A tropical cyclone passed overland to the west of Groote Eylandt, where hurricane-force winds generated a storm surge.
January 10–24, 1951 – During January 10, a tropical cyclone moved into the Gulf of Carpentria near Karumba. The system subsequently moved around the Gulf of Carpertaria, before it made landfall on Queensland near Karumba during January 22.
January 25, 1951 – A tropical cyclone became slow moving near Fraser Island.
February 20–28, 1951 – A tropical cyclone impacted the Solomon Islands, Vanuatu and New Caledonia.
March 15, 1951 – A tropical cyclone made landfall on Queensland near Maryborough.
March 24 – April 2, 1951 – A tropical cyclone impacted the Solomon Islands.

1951–52 
January 19–20, 1952 – A tropical cyclone made landfall near Weipa before it passed over Normanton.
March 3–12, 1952 – A possible tropical cyclone developed to the north-west of New Caledonia and moved south-eastwards, while located between Vanuatu and New Caledonia.

1952–53 
October 26–28, 1952 – A tropical cyclone existed off the coast of Queensland, Australia.
December 1952 – A tropical cyclone was reported to have caused extensive damage on Nissan Island.
December 1–2, 1952 – A small tropical cyclone impacted Thursday Island.
January 14, 1953 – A tropical cyclone made landfall on the Northern Territory near Mornington Island.
March 1–9, 1953 – A tropical cyclone developed to the south of the Solomon Islands and moved south-eastwards to impact New Caledonia.
March 22–23, 1953 – A tropical cyclone impacted Western Australia, where damage to banana plantations, windmills, houses and telegraph lines was estimated at £285 000.
March 26–29, 1953 – A tropical cyclone moved southwards over Groote Eylandt.
April 15–17, 1953 – A tropical cyclone moved from the Torres Strait to the northern coast of the Northern Territory.

1953–54 
December 1953 – A tropical cyclone impacted the Solomon Islands of Florida and Guadalcanal.
January 4–8, 1954 – A tropical cyclone moved southwards between Queensland and New Caledonia.
February 7, 1954 – A tropical cyclone made landfall on Queensland to the south of Townsville.
February 17–20, 1954 – A tropical cyclone made landfall on Queensland near Coolangatta.
March 2–7, 1954 – A tropical cyclone that originated over the Coral Sea, caused gales over the sea between Norfolk Island and New Caledonia.

1954–55 
December 31, 1954 – A tropical cyclone impacted Roebourne in Western Australia, where damage was estimated at £50 000.
January 10–12, 1955 – A tropical cyclone remained near stationary to the north of Weipa.
February 22–25, 1955 – A monsoon cyclone developed near Normanton and moved down through Queensland and into New South Wales.
March 7, 1955 – A tropical cyclone made landfall on Queensland to the south of Mackay.
March 23 – April 6, 1955 – A tropical cyclone developed over the Solomon Islands and moved southwestwards before it made landfall on Queensland near Bunderburg.

1955–56 
December 25, 1955 – January 1, 1956 – A tropical cyclone developed near the Solomon Islands and erratically moved south-eastwards towards New Caledonia.
January 16–17, 1956 – A tropical cyclone crossed the south-eastern coast of the Gulf of Carpentaria.
January 21–28, 1956 – A tropical cyclone developed near Willis Island and erratically moved along 160°E.
January 21–24, 1956 – A tropical cyclone developed to the northwest of New Caledonia and moved southwards.
February 16 – March 5, 1956 – A tropical cyclone impacted parts of Western Australia and the Northern Territory.
March 1, 1956 – A tropical cyclone moved parallel to the Pilbara coast, before heading down the west coast.
March 25, 1956 – A tropical cyclone made landfall near Gove.
April 3–7, 1956 – A tropical cyclone developed to the southeast of New Guinea and moved south-eastwards towards New Caledonia.
April 6–9, 1956 – A tropical cyclone developed to the north of New Caledonia.
March 6, 1956 – Tropical Cyclone Agnes.

1956–57 
December 22–24, 1956 – A possible tropical cyclone moved from north Queensland to the south of New Caledonia.
January 4–10, 1957 – A tropical cyclone developed over the Coral Sea and moved eastwards over New Caledonia.
February 14, 1957 – A tropical cyclone passed directly over Broome, Western Australia and killed two people.
February 19, 1957 – A tropical cyclone impacted New South Wales.

1957–58 
December 16–19, 1957 – A tropical cyclone was identified off the coast of North-Western Australia, however, it did not develop any further and filled up during December 19.
January 11–16, 1958 – A tropical cyclone moved from the Gulf of Carpentaria to the Kimberley in Western Australia.
January 13–18, 1958 – A tropical cyclone existed in the north-eastern Coral Sea.
January 15–22, 1958 – A tropical cyclone existed off the coast of Northwestern Australia.
February 8–16, 1958 – A tropical cyclone existed over the Indian Ocean and impacted the Cocos Islands.
February 12–24, 1958 – A tropical cyclone moved from the Gulf of Carpentaria and into the eastern Coral Sea.
February 13–16, 1958 – A tropical cyclone existed over the Indian Ocean.
March 1–5, 1958 – A tropical cyclone existed off the coast of Northwestern Australia and impacted Onslow.
March 6–7, 1958 – A tropical cyclone impacted central Queensland.
March 14–18, 1958 – A tropical cyclone existed off the coast of Northwestern Australia and impacted Onslow.
March 18–20, 1958 – A tropical cyclone existed over the southern Coral Sea.
March 31 – April 3, 1958 – A tropical cyclone moved from Willis Island to central Queensland where it impacted Bowen.
April 2–11, 1958 – A tropical cyclone impacted the Solomon Islands, Vanuatu and Fiji.
April 9, 1958 – A tropical cyclone existed in the north-eastern Coral Sea.
April 11–16, 1958 – A tropical cyclone made landfall near Port Roper in the Northern Territory.
April 17–23, 1958 – A tropical cyclone existed over the Coral Sea and impacted the Solomon Islands.
June 4–15, 1958 – A tropical cyclone existed over the Coral Sea and impacted New Zealand as well as the Solomon Islands.

1958–59 
October 1958 – A tropical cyclone impacted the Solomon Islands of Rennell and Vanikoro.
November 17–23, 1958 – A tropical cyclone existed over the Indian Ocean near the Cocos Islands.
December 30, 1958 – January 6, 1959 – A tropical cyclone existed over the Indian Ocean near Christmas Island and the Cocos Islands.
January 4–12, 1959 – A tropical cyclone existed over the Timor Sea and impacted the Northern Territory as well as the Kimberley.
January 4–23, 1959 – A tropical cyclone existed over Northern Australia and the Coral Sea.
January 15–21, 1959 – A tropical cyclone impacted Vanuatu, New Caledonia and New South Wales.
January 16–19, 1959 – A tropical cyclone entered the Gulf of Carpentaria near Mornington Island, before it made landfall on the south-eastern Gulf Of Carpentaria near the Gilbert River.
January 20, 1959 – A tropical cyclone moved into the Coral Sea from the Gulf of Carpentaria between Cooktown and Cairns.
January 21, 1959 – Tropical Cyclone Beatrice.
February 8–12, 1959 – A tropical cyclone existed over the Indian Ocean near the Cocos Islands.
February 11–19, 1959 – A tropical cyclone existed over the Coral Sea and impacted Eastern Australia.
March 5–12, 1959 – A tropical cyclone existed over the Indian Ocean.
March 5–16, 1959 – A tropical cyclone impacted the Solomon Islands and New Caledonia.
March 7–14, 1959 – Tropical Cyclone Ida.
March 16–24, 1959 – A tropical cyclone existed off the coast of Northwestern Australia.
April 2–11, 1959 – A tropical cyclone existed in the Arafura Sea and impacted the Kimberleys and Northwestern Australia.

1959–60 
December 19–30, 1959 – A tropical cyclone impacted the Solomon Islands, Vanuatu and Fiji.
December 24, 1959 – January 4, 1960 – A tropical cyclone moved eastwards across the Gulf of Carpentaria and the Cape York Peninsular, before impacting Vanuatu.
January 22–29, 1960 – A tropical cyclone existed off the coast of Northwestern Australia.
February 27 – March 5, 1960 – Tropical Cyclone Erika.
March 3–9, 1960 – A tropical cyclone existed within the Coral Sea and impacted Queensland.
March 14–28, 1960 – A tropical cyclone existed over the Coral Sea and moved over northern Australia into the Indian Ocean.
April 2–10, 1960 – Tropical Cyclone Gina.
April 4–8, 1960 – A tropical cyclone existed over the Indian Ocean near the Cocos Islands.
April 21–27, 1960 – A tropical cyclone existed over the Timor Sea and was encountered by a ship called the Straat Jahore.

See also 
Australian region tropical cyclone
Atlantic hurricane seasons: 1950, 1951, 1952, 1953, 1954, 1955, 1956, 1957, 1958, 1959
Eastern Pacific hurricane seasons: 1950, 1951, 1952, 1953, 1954, 1955, 1956, 1957, 1958, 1959
Western Pacific typhoon seasons: 1950, 1951, 1952, 1953, 1954, 1955, 1956, 1957, 1958, 1959
North Indian Ocean cyclone seasons: 1950, 1951, 1952, 1953, 1954, 1955, 1956, 1957, 1958, 1959

References

External links 

Australian region cyclone seasons
 disasters in Oceania